The Súľov Rocks is a  national nature reserve situated within the Súľov Mountains region of Slovakia.

It was declared in 1973 and is located in the Bytča District in Žilina Region. Rocky crags take the shape of towers, cones, needles, gates, and some rocks resemble figures or animals.

The area is accessible by hiking, climbing and biking.

References

External links
 www.sulov.com
 Climbing in Sulov Rocks - Mountaineering club Direct Bytca
 CLIMBING GUIDE

Protected areas of Slovakia
Protected areas of the Western Carpathians
Geography of Žilina Region
Tourist attractions in Žilina Region
Rock formations of Slovakia